Sir Edward Hussey, 1st Baronet (10 October 1585 – 22 March 1648) was an English politician who sat in the House of Commons of England  in 1640. He supported the Royalist side in the English Civil War.

Hussey was the son of Sir Charles Hussey of Honington and his wife Ellen Birch, daughter of Lord Chief Baron Birch. He was created a Baronet, of Honington in the County of Lincolnshire on 19 June 1611. In 1618 he was High Sheriff of Lincolnshire and had the role again in 1638.

In April 1640, Hussey was elected Member of Parliament for Lincolnshire in the Short Parliament. 
 
Hussey fought for the King in the Civil War and was one of those disqualified from public office under the Treaty of Uxbridge.

Family
Hussey married Elizabeth Anton, daughter of George Anton of Lincoln and had four sons and five daughters. Hussey was succeeded in the baronetcy by his grandson Thomas. Another grandson William was an ambassador under William III.
 Thomas died in 1641.
 Rebecca Hussey married Sir Robert Markham, son of Sir Anthony Markham of Sedgebrook and Bridget Markham.

References

1648 deaths
English MPs 1640 (April)
Baronets in the Baronetage of England
High Sheriffs of Lincolnshire
1585 births
Cavaliers